Euljiro 3(sam)-ga Station is a station on the Seoul Subway Line 2 and Seoul Subway Line 3.

References

 

Seoul Metropolitan Subway stations
Metro stations in Jung District, Seoul
Railway stations opened in 1983
Seoul Subway Line 3
Seoul Subway Line 2
1983 establishments in South Korea
20th-century architecture in South Korea